Northern Television was the name of a regional television system in northern British Columbia, composed of two private CBC Television stations, CFTK-TV and CJDC-TV.

History
It was also known as "NTV", but should not be confused with CJON-DT, an unrelated station in Newfoundland and Labrador that also identifies itself as "NTV".

The network was disbanded and succeeded by a newer system, Great West Television (joined by CKPG-TV).

References

Canadian television systems
CBC Television
Defunct broadcasting companies of Canada
Mass media in British Columbia
Television channels and stations established in 1955
1955 establishments in British Columbia